A. maritima may refer to:

 Abronia maritima, the red sand verbena, a beach-adapted perennial plant species
 Alnus maritima, the seaside alder, a plant species
 Anisolabis maritima, the maritime earwig or the seaside earwig, an earwig species
 Armeria maritima, a flowering plant species
 Anurida maritima, a cosmopolitan collembolan species of the intertidal zone
 Armada maritima, a moth species found in Saudi Arabia, Oman, the United Arab Emirates and Israel
 Artemisia maritima, the sea wormwood or old woman, a plant species

See also
 Maritima (disambiguation)